Rafidia Surgical Hospital is a government hospital in the Nablus city, West Bank, Palestine. Followed by the Palestinian Ministry of Health. It was built in 1976 and has 200 surgical beds. It employs 628 staff, including a doctor, nurse, pharmacist, physiotherapist, laboratory technician, radiologist and others.

References 

Hospitals in Nablus